Coria Cove is the 1 km wide cove indenting for 1.15 km the east coast of Liège Island in the Palmer Archipelago, Antarctica. British mapping in 1978.

Maps
 British Antarctic Territory.  Scale 1:200000 topographic map.  DOS 610 Series, Sheet W 64 60.  Directorate of Overseas Surveys, UK, 1978.
 Antarctic Digital Database (ADD). Scale 1:250000 topographic map of Antarctica. Scientific Committee on Antarctic Research (SCAR). Since 1993, regularly upgraded and updated.

References
 Caleta Coria. SCAR Composite Antarctic Gazetteer.

Coves of Graham Land
Liège Island